Arnaldo Fabris (16 August 1916 – 15 August 2003) was an Italian ice hockey player. He competed in the men's tournament at the 1948 Winter Olympics.

References

External links
 

1916 births
2003 deaths
Olympic ice hockey players of Italy
Ice hockey players at the 1948 Winter Olympics
Sportspeople from Bologna